Lecrae is an American Christian hip hop artist. His career began in 2004 when he and Ben Washer co-founded the record label Reach Records.  In 2007 his first album, Real Talk (2005), received a nomination at the Stellar Awards and his second album, After the Music Stops (2007), was nominated at the GMA Dove Awards. The following year Lecrae's third album, Rebel, became the first Christian hip hop album to chart at number one on the U.S. Billboard Gospel Albums Chart. In 2011 his fourth album, Rehab (2010), received a Grammy nomination for Best Rock Gospel Album. That year Lecrae began achieving mainstream success and recognition after he collaborated with DJ Statik Selektah on the song "Live & Let Live" and performed at the 2011 BET Hip Hop Awards Cypher. The following year he garnered two GMA Dove awards: Rap/Hip Hop Album of the Year for Rehab: The Overdose (2011) and Rap/Hip Hop Recorded Song of the Year for "Hallelujah" (2011). He also released the mixtape Church Clothes and the studio album Gravity, the latter of which of has been called the most important album in Christian hip hop history by Rapzilla and Atlanta Daily World.

In 2013, Lecrae became the first hip hop artist to win the Grammy Award for Best Gospel Album for his sixth album Gravity. In the same year the album won Rap/Hip Hop Album of the Year at the GMA Dove Awards, and a Stellar Award for Rap, Hip Hop Gospel CD of the Year. In 2015, he received the Grammy Award for Best Contemporary Christian Music Performance/Song for "Messengers" (2014), Artist of the Year, Rap/Hip-Hop Song of the Year, and Rap/Hip-Hop Album of the Year of the year at the Dove Awards, a Stellar Award for Rap, Hip Hop Gospel CD of the Year, and a Billboard Music Award for Top Christian Album for Anomaly (2014). The same year he became the first rapper to win a BET Award for Best Gospel Artist. Anomaly also topped the Gospel charts and the U.S. Billboard 200, the first album to ever top both charts simultaneously.  In 2017, the song "Can't Stop Me Now (Destination)" won the BET Dr. Bobby Jones Best Gospel/Inspirational Award, and the following year he won the same award for his single "I'll Find You" featuring Tori Kelly. The music video to "I'll Find You" also won a Dove Award for Short Form Video of the Year. The song "Deep End", from Restoration (2020), won the Dove Award for Best Rap/Hip Hop Song at the 2021 awards. In 2021 he collaborated with 1K Phew for the mixtape No Church in a While, which won Best Rap/Hip Hop Gospel Album at the 2022 Stellar Awards and Best Rap/Hip Hop Album at the 2022 Dove Awards. In total, Lecrae has won twenty-four awards and received an additional fifty-one nominations.

BET Awards
The BET Awards were established in 2001 by BET to honor African Americans and other minorities in entertainment. The awards are determined by a voting academy made up of 150 music and media industry experts, bloggers, and fans. Lecrae has received three awards for the Dr. Bobby Jones Best Gospel/Inspirational Award (formerly the Best Gospel Artist Award) out of five nominations. His win in 2015 was the first time that a rapper had won the Best Gospel Artist award.

!
|-
!scope="row" style="font-weight:normal;" | 2013
|| Lecrae || Best Gospel Artist ||  || 
|-
!scope="row" style="font-weight:normal;" | 2015
|| Lecrae || Best Gospel Artist ||  || 
|-
!scope="row" style="font-weight:normal;" | 2016
|| Lecrae || Best Gospel Artist ||  || 
|-
!scope="row" style="font-weight:normal;" | 2017
|| "Can't Stop Me Now (Destination)" || Dr. Bobby Jones Best Gospel/Inspirational Award ||  || 
|-
!scope="row" style="font-weight:normal;" | 2018
|| "I'll Find You" (featuring Tori Kelly) || Dr. Bobby Jones Best Gospel/Inspirational Award ||  || 
|-

BET Hip Hop Awards
The BET Hip Hop Awards, first broadcast by BET in 2006, honor the best in hip hop for the year. The awards are determined by a voting academy made up of journalists, music industry experts, and fans. Lecrae has received three nominations.

!
|-
!scope="row" style="font-weight:normal;"|  2014
| "Nuthin'" || Best Impact Track ||  || 
|-
!scope="row" style="font-weight:normal;"| 2017
| "Blessings" (featuring Ty Dolla $ign) || Best Impact Track ||  || 
|-
!scope="row" style="font-weight:normal;"| 2018
| "I'll Find You" (featuring Tori Kell) || Best Impact Track ||  || 
|-

Billboard Music Awards
The Billboard Music Awards are sponsored by the Billboard magazine and are based on consumer statistics including album and digital singles sales, radio airplay, touring, and streaming, as well data on social interaction with music on various social media platforms. These metrics are tracked year-round by Billboard and associated data partners such as Nielsen SoundScan and Next Big Sound. Lecrae has received one award win out of four Billboard Music Award nominations.

!
|-
!scope="row" style="font-weight:normal;"|  2013
| Gravity || Top Christian Album ||  || 
|-
!scope="row" style="font-weight:normal;"| 2015
| Anomaly || Top Christian Album ||  ||
|-
!scope="row" style="font-weight:normal;"| 2015
| Lecrae || Top Christian Artist ||  || 
|-
!scope="row" rowspan="2" style="font-weight:normal;"| 2018
| "I'll Find You" (featuring Tori Kelly) || Top Christian Song ||  ||

GMA Dove Awards
A Dove Award is an accolade by the Gospel Music Association (GMA) of the United States to recognize outstanding achievement and excellence in the Christian music and Gospel music industries. It was first awarded in 1969. Lecrae has won eleven awards out of forty nominations.

!
|-
!scope="row" style="font-weight:normal;"| 2007
| After the Music Stops || Rap/Hip Hop Album of the Year ||  || 
|-
!scope="row" style="font-weight:normal;" | 2007
| "Jesus Muzik" (featuring Trip Lee) || Rap/Hip Hop Recorded Song of the Year ||  || 
|-
!scope="row" style="font-weight:normal;" | 2009
| Rebel || Rap/Hip Hop Album of the Year ||  || 
|-
!scope="row" style="font-weight:normal;" | 2009
| "Joyful Noise" (Flame featuring Lecrae and John Reilly) || Rap/Hip Hop Recorded Song of the Year ||  || 
|-
!scope="row" style="font-weight:normal;"| 2011
| Rehab || Rap/Hip Hop Album of the Year ||  || 
|-
!scope="row" style="font-weight:normal;"|  2011
| "Background" (featuring C-Lite) || Rap/Hip Hop Recorded Song of the Year ||  || 
|-
!scope="row" style="font-weight:normal;"| 2012
| Lecrae || Artist of the Year ||  || 
|-
!scope="row" style="font-weight:normal;"| 2012
| Rehab: The Overdose || Rap/Hip Hop Album of the Year ||  || 
|-
!scope="row" style="font-weight:normal;"| 2012
| "Hallelujah" || Rap/Hip Hop Recorded Song of the Year ||  || 
|-
!scope="row" style="font-weight:normal;"| 2012
| "Overdose" || Rap/Hip Hop Recorded Song of the Year ||  || 
|-
!scope="row" style="font-weight:normal;"| 2013
| Lecrae || Artist of the Year ||  || 
|-
!scope="row" style="font-weight:normal;"| 2013
| Gravity || Rap/Hip Hop Album of the Year ||  || 
|-
!scope="row" style="font-weight:normal;"| 2013
| "Tell the World" (featuring Mali Music) ||  Rap/Hip Hop Recorded Song of the Year ||  || 
|-
!scope="row" style="font-weight:normal;"| 2013
| "I'm Good" (Trip Lee featuring Lecrae) ||  Rap/Hip Hop Recorded Song of the Year ||  || 
|-
!scope="row" style="font-weight:normal;"| 2014
| Lecrae || Artist of the Year ||  || 
|-
!scope="row" style="font-weight:normal;"| 2014
| "Help"(Erica Campbell featuring Lecrae) || Gospel Performance of the Year ||  || 
|-
!scope="row" style="font-weight:normal;"| 2014
| "Dear Mr. Christian" (Derek Minor featuring Dee-1 and Lecrae) || Rap/Hip Hop Recorded Song of the Year ||  || 
|-
!scope="row" style="font-weight:normal;"| 2015
|| Lecrae || Artist of the Year||  || 
|-
!scope="row" style="font-weight:normal;"| 2015
|| Lecrae || Contemporary Christian Artist of the Year ||  || 
|-
!scope="row" style="font-weight:normal;"| 2015
| "All I Need is You" || Rap/Hip-Hop Song of the Year ||  || 
|-
!scope="row" style="font-weight:normal;"| 2015
| "Sideways" (KB featuring Lecrae) || Rap/Hip-Hop Song of the Year ||  || 
|-
!scope="row" style="font-weight:normal;"| 2015
| Anomaly || Rap/Hip-Hop Album Of The Year ||  || 
|-
!scope="row" style="font-weight:normal;"| 2015
| "Messengers" (featuring For King & Country) || Rock/Contemporary Song Of The Year ||  || 
|-
!scope="row" style="font-weight:normal;"| 2015
| Anomaly || Recorded Music Packaging ||  || 
|-
!scope="row" style="font-weight:normal;"| 2016
| Lecrae || Artist of the Year||  || 
|-
!scope="row" style="font-weight:normal;"| 2016
| Church Clothes 3 || Rap/Hip Hop Album of the Year ||  || 
|- 
!scope="row" style="font-weight:normal;"| 2016
| "Can't Do You" (featuring E-40) || Rap/Hip Hop Recorded Song of the Year ||  || 
|-
!scope="row" style="font-weight:normal;"| 2018
| "Blessings" (featuring Ty Dolla Sign) || Song of the Year ||  || 
|-
!scope="row" style="font-weight:normal;"| 2018
| "I'll Find You" (featuring Tori Kelly) || Song of the Year ||  || 
|-
!scope="row" style="font-weight:normal;"| 2018
| Lecrae || Songwriter of the Year ||  || 
|-
!scope="row" style="font-weight:normal;"| 2018
| "I'll Find You" (featuring Tori Kelly) || Short Form Video of the Year ||  || 
|-
!scope="row" style="font-weight:normal;"| 2019
| "Fight for Me" (Gawvi featuring Lecrae) || Rap/Hip Hop Recorded Song of the Year ||  || 
|-
!scope="row" style="font-weight:normal;"| 2019
| "Get Back Right" (with Zaytoven) || Rap/Hip Hop Recorded Song of the Year ||  || 
|-
!scope="row" style="font-weight:normal;"| 2019
| Let the Trap Say Amen (with Zaytoven) || Rap/Hip Hop Album of the Year ||  || 
|-
!scope="row" style="font-weight:normal;"| 2020
| "Set Me Free" (featuring YK Osiris) || Rap/Hip Hop Recorded Song of the Year ||  || 
|-
!scope="row" style="font-weight:normal;"| 2021
| "Deep End" || Rap/Hip Hop Recorded Song of the Year ||  || 
|-
!scope="row" style="font-weight:normal;"| 2021
| "Reasons" (Hulvey featuring Lecrae and Svrcina || Rap/Hip Hop Recorded Song of the Year ||  || 
|-
!scope="row" style="font-weight:normal;"| 2021
| Restoration || Rap/Hip Hop Album of the Year ||  || 
|-
!scope="row" style="font-weight:normal;"| 2022
| No Church in a While (with 1K Phew) || Rap/Hip Hop Album of the Year ||  || 
|-
!scope="row" style="font-weight:normal;"| 2022
| "Wildin" (with 1K Phew) || Rap/Hip Hop Song of the Year ||  ||

Grammy Awards
The Grammy Awards are awarded annually by the National Academy of Recording Arts and Sciences in the United States to honor excellence in the recording arts and sciences. A panel of over 150 industry experts screen the nominations, from which the winners are determined by Academy voting members. Lecrae has received eight Grammy nominations. His win in 2013 for Best Gospel Album was the first such for a hip hop artist.

!
|-
!scope="row" style="font-weight:normal;"| 2011
| Rehab || Best Rock Gospel Album ||  || 
|-
!scope="row" style="font-weight:normal;"| 2013
| Gravity || Best Gospel Album ||  || 
|-
!scope="row" style="font-weight:normal;"| 2015
| "All I Need Is You" || Best Rap Performance ||  || 
|-
!scope="row" style="font-weight:normal;"| 2015
| "Messengers" (featuring For King & Country) || Best Contemporary Christian Music Performance/Song ||  || 
|-
!scope="row" style="font-weight:normal;"|  2015
| "Help" (Erica Campbell featuring Lecrae) || Best Gospel Performance/Song ||  || 
|-
!scope="row" style="font-weight:normal;"|  2020—2021
| "Come Together" (Rodney Jerkins featuring Tim Bowman, Jr.,Joy Enriquez, Kirk Franklin, Kelontae Gavin, Fred Hammond,Heavenly Joy, Le’Andria Johnson, Lecrae, Mary Mary, Jac Ross,Marvin Sapp, Karen Clark Sheard, Kierra Sheard, and Shelby 5) || Best Gospel Performance/Song ||  || 
|-
!scope="row" style="font-weight:normal;"|  2020—2021
| "Sunday Morning" (featuring Kirk Franklin) || Best Contemporary Christian Music Performance/Song ||  || 
|-
!scope="row" style="font-weight:normal;"|  2020—2021
| "Come Together" (Rodney Jerkins featuring Tim Bowman, Jr.,Joy Enriquez, Kirk Franklin, Kelontae Gavin, Fred Hammond,Heavenly Joy, Le’Andria Johnson, Lecrae, Mary Mary, Jac Ross,Marvin Sapp, Karen Clark Sheard, Kierra Sheard, and Shelby 5) || Best Contemporary Christian Music Performance/Song ||  || 
|-

Stellar Awards
The Stellar Awards is an awards show that honors artists, writers, and other industry professionals in Gospel music, produced by Central City Productions. Members of the Stellar Awards Gospel Music Academy submit nominations, verify the eligibility of nominations, and vote for winners in the first ballot. Starting in 2012, the second and final ballot is available to the public, who determine the final four entries for each category and decide on a winner within that category. Lecrae has received six Stellar Award nominations, of which he has won three awards.

!
|-
!scope="row" style="font-weight:normal;" | 2007
| Real Talk || Rap, Hip Hop Gospel CD of the Year ||  || 
|-
!scope="row" style="font-weight:normal;"| 2010
| Rebel || Rap, Hip Hop Gospel CD of the Year ||  || 
|-
!scope="row" style="font-weight:normal;"| 2012
| Rehab || Rap, Hip Hop Gospel CD of the Year ||  || 
|-
!scope="row" style="font-weight:normal;"| 2012
| Rehab: The Overdose || Rap, Hip Hop Gospel CD of the Year ||   || 
|-
!scope="row" style="font-weight:normal;"| 2014
| Gravity || Rap, Hip Hop Gospel CD of the Year ||  || 
|-
!scope="row" style="font-weight:normal;"| 2015
| Anomaly || Rap, Hip Hop Gospel CD of the Year ||  || 
|-
!scope="row" style="font-weight:normal;"| 2022
| 1K Phew and Lecrae || Duo/Chorus Group of the Year ||  || 
|-
!scope="row" style="font-weight:normal;"| 2022
| No Church in a While || Rap/Hip Hop Gospel Album of the Year ||  || 
|-
!scope="row" style="font-weight:normal;"| 2022
| "One Call" || Rap/Hip Hop Song of the Year ||  ||

Soul Train Music Awards
The Soul Train Music Awards are produced by the variety television program Soul Train. Awards are determined by a panel consisting of over five hundred individuals in the music, media, and blogging industries. Lecrae has received four Soul Train awards out of five nominations.

!
|- 
!scope="row" style="font-weight:normal;"| 2013
| "Confessions" || Best Gospel/Inspirational Performance ||  || 
|-
!scope="row" style="font-weight:normal;"| 2014
| "Help" (Erica Campbell featuring Lecrae) || Best Gospel/Inspirational Song ||  || 
|-
!scope="row" style="font-weight:normal;"| 2015
| "All I Need Is You"  || Best Gospel/Inspirational Song ||  || 
|-
!scope="row" style="font-weight:normal;"| 2017
| Lecrae  || Best Gospel/Inspirational Award||  || 
|-
!scope="row" style="font-weight:normal;"| 2018
| Lecrae  || Best Gospel/Inspirational Award||  ||

References

External links 
 Awards at AllMusic

Awards and nominations
Lecrae